Miroslav Kopřiva (born 5 December 1983) is a Czech former professional ice hockey goaltender who last played for the Coventry Blaze of the EIHL. He was drafted 187th overall by the Minnesota Wild in 2003.

Kopřiva is the first ever Blaze goaltender to get MOTM in all three of his games following his debut and is the second player of any position in the team's history to achieve this feat.

References

External links

1983 births
Living people
HC Slavia Praha players
Rytíři Kladno players
Houston Aeros (1994–2013) players
Czech ice hockey goaltenders
Minnesota Wild draft picks
Sportspeople from Kladno
Czech expatriate ice hockey players in the United States
Czech expatriate ice hockey players in Slovakia
Czech expatriate sportspeople in England
Czech expatriate sportspeople in Poland
Expatriate ice hockey players in England
Expatriate ice hockey players in Poland